27270 Guidotti, provisional designation , is a carbonaceous background asteroid from the inner regions of the asteroid belt, approximately 7 kilometers in diameter. It was discovered on 2 January 2000, by Italian astronomers Luciano Tesi and Alfredo Caronia at the Pistoia Mountains Astronomical Observatory in San Marcello Pistoiese, Italy. The asteroid was named after amateur astronomer Guido Guidotti.

Orbit and classification 

Guidotti is a non-family from the main belt's background population. It orbits the Sun in the inner asteroid belt at a distance of 2.3–2.6 AU once every 3 years and 10 months (1,398 days). Its orbit has an eccentricity of 0.06 and an inclination of 3° with respect to the ecliptic.

The body's observation arc begins with a precovery from the Digitized Sky Survey taken at Palomar Observatory in October 1991, more than 8 years prior to its official discovery observation at San Marcello in 2000.

Physical characteristics 

Guidotti has been characterized as a carbonaceous C-type asteroid by Pan-STARRS photometric survey, as well as by SDSS-MFB (Masi Foglia Bus).

Rotation period 

In March 2008, a rotational lightcurve of Guidotti was obtained from photometric observations by Slovak astronomers Adrian Galad and Leonard Kornoš. Analysis of the fragmentary lightcurve gave a rotation period of 2.6 hours with a brightness amplitude of 0.3 magnitude. As of 2017, no secure period has been obtained.

Diameter and albedo 

Guidotti has not been observed by any of the spaced-based surveys such as the NEOWISE mission of NASA's Wide-field Infrared Survey Explorer, the Japanese Akari satellite or the Infrared Astronomical Satellite.

The Collaborative Asteroid Lightcurve Link assumes a standard albedo for stony asteroids of 0.20 and calculates a diameter of 3.74 kilometers based on an absolute magnitude of 14.5. Based on a generic magnitude-to diameter conversion, using a typical albedo for carbonaceous asteroids of 0.06, Guidotti measures 6.9 kilometers in diameter.

Naming 

This minor planet was named after Guido Guidotti (born 1946), an Italian amateur astronomer and founder of the Association of Astronomy "A. Pieri", in Valdinievole, Tuscany, Italy. He is an observer of asteroids and comets, and organizer of lectures and exhibitions on astronomical subjects. The official naming citation was published by the Minor Planet Center on 26 November 2004.

References

External links 
 Associazione Astrofili Valdinievole "A. Pieri"
 Asteroid Lightcurve Database (LCDB), query form (info )
 Dictionary of Minor Planet Names, Google books
 Asteroids and comets rotation curves, CdR – Observatoire de Genève, Raoul Behrend
 Discovery Circumstances: Numbered Minor Planets (25001)-(30000) – Minor Planet Center
 
 

027270
Discoveries by Luciano Tesi
Discoveries by Alfredo Caronia
Named minor planets
20000102